RFA Dewdale (A129) was a mobile bulk tanker of the Royal Fleet Auxiliary.

References

Tankers of the Royal Fleet Auxiliary
1965 ships